Freiburger usually refers to the city Freiburg im Breisgau in Germany or a person or thing from there. Examples include:

Freiburger FC, a football team (Soccer)
Freiburger Barockorchester, an orchestra
Freiburger Münster (Freiburg Minster), a cathedral
Freiburger Pilsner, a beer produced by Ganter Brewery

Freiburger can also mean:

Mark Freiburger, an American film director
Vern Freiburger, a Major League Baseball player
Freiburger, a synonym for the German wine grape Freisamer

See also
Freiburg (disambiguation)